Pam Gulleson is a former member of the North Dakota House of Representatives for the North Dakota Democratic-NPL Party, representing the 26th district from 1993 to 2009. She is now Vice President of Public Affairs at Blue Cross Blue Shield of North Dakota.

Early life, education, and early political career
Pam and her husband Bill farm corn, beans, and alfalfa. They operate a cattle feedlot. She got a BS in education and nutrition from NDSU and a degree in public administration from MSUM.  Pam's sons are now the fifth generation of Gullesons to farm and ranch near Rutland in Sergeant County.  Gulleson was raised on a dairy farm near Oakes, ND.

She also served as Senior Legislative Advisor and Chief of Staff for former U.S. Senator Byron Dorgan for nine years. she advanced major initiatives on farm, energy, trade, Native Americans, water development, flood protection, and research.  She is especially known for her work in creating the Red River Valley Research Corridor.  Pam also worked as an executive officer and advisor to the president for North Dakota Farmers Union. Pam also worked as director of Public Health in Sergeant County and directing programming at the North Dakota State College of Science in Wahpeton.

North Dakota House of Representatives

Elections
She was elected in 1992 and won re-election every four years after that. In 2000, she won re-election with 28%. In 2004, she won re-election with 53%.

Tenure
She held many leadership positions over the years. She was the assistant Democratic House minority leader in the late 1990s. In 1996, she criticized Governor Ed Schafer in the official Democratic response to Schafer's State of the State address saying that he thinks "the governorship is a personal trophy.Committee assignments
Standing
Appropriations

Interim
Budget Section
Public Safety
Workforce

2012 congressional election

On September 21, 2011, Gulleson announced her candidacy for the Democratic-NPL Party nomination for North Dakota's At-large congressional district in the 2012 election. Gulleson was unopposed in the nominating contest, but lost the election to Republican Kevin Cramer.

References

External links
Pam Gulleson for Congress official website
Representative Pam Gulleson at the official North Dakota Legislative Assembly websiteFollow the Money'' – Pam Gulleson
2006 2004 2000 1998 campaign contributions

1947 births
Living people
Women state legislators in North Dakota
20th-century American politicians
20th-century American women politicians
21st-century American politicians
21st-century American women politicians
Democratic Party members of the North Dakota House of Representatives